Double Springs–Winston County Airport  is a public-use airport located four nautical miles (5 mi, 7 km) east of Double Springs, a town in Winston County, Alabama, United States.

Facilities and aircraft 
Double Springs–Winston County Airport covers an area of 65 acres (26 ha) at an elevation of 753 feet (230 m) above mean sea level. It has one runway designated 3/21 with an asphalt surface measuring 3,403 by 79 feet (1,037 x 24 m).

For the 12 months period ending April 27, 2010, the airport had 3,750 general aviation aircraft's operations, an average of 10 per day. At that time there were six aircraft based at this airport: four single-engine, one jet, and one helicopter.

References

External links 
 Aerial image as of 16 January 1999 from USGS The National Map

Airports in Alabama
Transportation buildings and structures in Winston County, Alabama